SS Wendell L. Willkie was a Liberty ship built in the United States during World War II. She was named after Wendell L. Willkie, an American lawyer, corporate executive, and the 1940 Republican nominee for President.

Construction 
Wendell L. Willkie was laid down on 8 November 1944, under a Maritime Commission (MARCOM) contract, MC hull 2333, by J.A. Jones Construction, Panama City, Florida; and launched on 9 December 1944.

History
She was allocated to the Stockard Steamship Corp., 21 December 1944. On 26 July 1949, she was placed in the National Defense Reserve Fleet, Mobile, Alabama.

After a return to service 18 January 1952, she was returned to the Mobile Reserve Fleet, 17 March 1952. She was sold for scrapping, 12 January 1970, to Pinto Island Metals Co., for $44,000. She was withdrawn from the fleet, 10 March 1970.

References

Bibliography 

 
 
 
 

 

Liberty ships
Ships built in Panama City, Florida
1944 ships
Mobile Reserve Fleet